Song Maojin was a Chinese landscape painter during the Ming Dynasty (1368–1644). His specific dates of birth and death are unknown.

Song was born in the Songjiang province. His style name was Mingzhi (明之). Song studied under Song Xu, and his reputation for landscapes rivaled Zhao Zuo and Liu Jue.

References

Painters from Shanghai
Ming dynasty landscape painters
Year of death unknown
Year of birth unknown